Isaac Sprague (September 5, 1811 – 1895) was a self-taught landscape, botanical, and ornithological painter. He was America's best known botanical illustrator of his day.

Sprague was born in Hingham, Massachusetts and apprenticed with his uncle as a carriage painter.

In 1840, a young Sprague met John James Audubon, who had admired Sprague's bird drawings. In 1843, Sprague served as an assistant to Audubon on an ornithological expedition up the Missouri River, taking measurements and making sketches. Sprague's pipit (Anthus spragueii), an uncommon and inconspicuous bird, was discovered on that expedition and named for Sprague. Some of Sprague's fine drawings were incorporated into Audubon's later publications, without credit. Sprague's diary of this expedition is in the Boston Athenaeum.

In 1845, Sprague met Asa Gray (1810–1888) of Harvard College, and, over many years, Sprague illustrated several of Gray’s works, including the plates for the atlas (1857) to "Botany. Phanerogamia" in Charles Wilkes' United States Exploring Expedition During the Years 1838, 1839, 1840, 1841, 1842 (1845–1876). He also illustrated Asa Gray and John Torrey's various volumes of the U. S. War Department's Reports... (1855–1860), as well as works for George B. Emerson, George Goodale, and Alpheus Baker Hervey.

In 1960, Harvard University's Houghton Library exhibited approximately 100 of Sprague’s paintings, drawings and illustrations. In 2003, Sprague's works were included in the Hunt Institute’s exhibition American Botanical Prints of Two Centuries.

Major collections of Sprague's work are held by the Boston Athenaeum, the Museum of Fine Arts (Boston), the Smithsonian Institution (on indefinite loan to the Hunt Institute for Botanical Verification, Carnegie Mellon University), and by Harvard University.

Selected illustrations 

 1842 Botanical Text-book by Asa Gray
 1856 Manual of the Botany of the Northern United States by Asa Gray, ed. 2
 1848 White Mountain Scenery by William Oakes
 1848-1849 Genera Florae Americae Boreali-Orientalis by Asa Gray
 1855-1860 Reports of Explorations and Surveys, to Ascertain the Most Practicable and Economical Route for a Railroad Route from the Mississippi River to the Pacific Ocean, U. S. War Department
 1875 Report on the Trees and Shrubs Growing Naturally in the Forests of Massachusetts, George B. Emerson, ed. 2
 1876-1882 Wild Flowers of America by George Goodale
 1882 Beautiful Wild Flowers of America by Alpheus Baker Hervey
 1883 Flowers of Field and Forest by Alpheus Baker Hervey
 1883 Wayside Flowers and Ferns by Alpheus Baker Hervey

References 
 Isaac Sprague at American Art Gallery
 Emanuel D. Rudolph, "Isaac Sprague, 'Delineator and Naturalist'" in the Journal of the History of Biology (1990, vol. 23, no. 1, pp. 91–126).

External links 
 Art of Isaac Sprague at the Boston Athenaeum

Botanical illustrators
19th-century American painters
American male painters
1811 births
1895 deaths
People from Hingham, Massachusetts
19th-century American male artists